Binibining Pilipinas 2000 was the 37th edition of Binibining Pilipinas. It took place at the Smart Araneta Coliseum in Quezon City, Metro Manila, Philippines on February 26, 2000.

At the end of the event, Miriam Quiambao crowned Nina Ricci Alagao as Binibining Pilipinas Universe 2000, while Georgina Sandico crowned Joanna Maria Peñaloza as Binibining Pilipinas International 2000. Lalaine Edson was supposed to crown Katherine Annwen de Guzman as Binibining Pilipinas World 2000, but was crowned by Daisy Reyes. Cristina Tan was named First Runner-Up, while Nicole Hofer was named Second Runner-Up.

Results
Color keys
  The contestant did not place.

Special Awards

Contestants 
27 contestants competed for the three titles.

Notes

Post-pageant Notes
 Nina Ricci Alagao competed at Miss Universe 2000 in Nicosia, Cyprus but was unplaced. Katherine De Guzman and Joanna Maria Peñaloza also did not place when they competed at Miss World 2000 and Miss International 2000, respectively.
 Maricar Balagtas and Gemma Louise Heaton both competed again at Binibining Pilipinas 2001. Balagtas was named 2nd Runner-Up, and was appointed to represent the Philippines at Miss Globe International 2001 in Istanbul where she was crowned Miss Globe International 2001. She competed again at Binibining Pilipinas 2004, where she was crowned Binibining Pilipinas-Universe 2004 and competed at Miss Universe 2004 in Quito, Ecuador but was unplaced.
 Anna Liza Bernal competed at Mutya ng Pilipinas 2001 in Taguig and was one of the ten semifinalists. On the other hand, Anjelly Gamboa competed at the inaugural edition of Miss Philippines Earth and was named 2nd Runner-Up.

References

2000
2000 in the Philippines
2000 beauty pageants